Aghabullogue or Aghabulloge is a village and parish in the barony of Muskerry East in northwest County Cork, Ireland.

The parish of Aghabullogue includes the villages of Aghabullogue, Coachford and Rylane in County Cork. The civil parish consists of 31 townlands.

It has a public house and shop, a national school, community hall and a Roman Catholic church. Saint Olan (or Olann) is the patron saint of the parish.

Aghabullogue Hurling Club won Cork's first All-Ireland in 1890.

Notable natives 
 Dan Drew, hurler

See also
 List of towns and villages in Ireland

References

Towns and villages in County Cork